Iqbal Azad is an Indian film and television actor who works mainly in the television Industry including in serials like Nadaniyaan, Tedi Medi Family and Bepannah.

He has also worked in films like Mukt (2001), 340 (2009), and It’s a Man’s World (2010).

Career

Filmography

Television

Films

References

External links

Living people
Indian male film actors
Indian male television actors
Year of birth missing (living people)